Humibacter is a Gram-positive, mesophilic, strictly aerobic, chemoorganotrophic and motile genus of bacteria from the family of Microbacteriaceae. Humibacter occur in sewage sludge.

References

Further reading 
 

Microbacteriaceae
Bacteria genera